Bruno Millienne (born 28 November 1959) is a French politician representing the Democratic Movement. He was elected to the French National Assembly on 18 June 2017, representing the department of Yvelines.

Millienne worked for M6 and was also a councilor for Jumeauville.

References

1959 births
Living people
Deputies of the 15th National Assembly of the French Fifth Republic
Democratic Movement (France) politicians
People from Argenteuil
Politicians from Île-de-France
Members of Parliament for Yvelines
Deputies of the 16th National Assembly of the French Fifth Republic